The Pyongyang University of Music and Dance is a North Korean performing arts university founded in July 1972 in the Taedonggang District of Pyongyang from a merge with the Pyongyang Art College. Its facilities include a full orchestra and a music hall covering 5,501 square meters. 30 percent of the university's teachers have academic degrees and titles.

The university's education system consists of four- to five-year regular courses and two- to three-year special courses. There is also an additional 2-year kindergarten course, 4 year primary course and a 3-year preparatory course for young musicians and performers.

Originally the Pyongyang Dance College, founded on March 1, 1949, the university merged with the Pyongyang Art College in 1972 to become the Pyongyang University of Music and Dance. Its newly developed buildings saw the "on-the-spot" guidance Kim Il-Sung and Kim Jong-Il whilst being built.

Departments
National instrumental music
Modern instrumental music
Vocal music
Dance and composition (practical and theory)

Notable alumni

Cheol Woong Kim
Il-Jin Kim
Kim Ok
Heung Min Son

See also 
 List of universities in North Korea

References

Universities in North Korea
1972 establishments in North Korea
Educational institutions established in 1972
20th-century architecture in North Korea